Beaumont  is a civil parish in the Carlisle district of Cumbria, England.  It contains 26 listed buildings that are recorded in the National Heritage List for England.  Of these, one is listed at Grade II*, the middle of the three grades, and the others are at Grade II, the lowest grade.  The parish contains the settlements of Beaumont, Kirkandrews-upon-Eden, Monkhill, and Grinsdale, and is otherwise mainly rural.  Most of the listed buildings are houses and associated structures, farmhouses and farm buildings.  The other listed buildings include churches and associated structures, a former windmill, and a public house.


Key

Buildings

References

Citations

Sources

Lists of listed buildings in Cumbria
Listed buildings